A bracket is a tall punctuation mark typically used in matched pairs within text.

Bracket may also refer to:

Architecture and engineering
 Bracket (architecture), an architectural element, a structural or decorative member
 Corbel or decorative bracket, used in furniture and mantelpieces
 Bracket, a general term for an object used for support
 Automotive bracket, various brackets used in List of auto parts
 Angle bracket, a type of fastener to join two parts
 Bottom bracket, in bicycles
 Blade bracket, in ceiling fans
 Bracket, a component of dental braces

Entertainment
 Bracket (band), a pop punk band
 "The Bracket", an episode of television series How I Met Your Mother
 (film), a 2003 film directed by Morgan Fisher
 (album), an album by the Icelandic band Sigur Rós
 Bracket (music group), a Nigerian afropop music group

Mathematics and science
 Bracket fungus, fungi in the phylum Basidiomycota
 Bracket (mathematics), symbols used to specify the order of operations
 Curly-bracket languages, in programming
 Lie bracket of vector fields, multiple meanings
 Poisson bracket, an operator used in mathematics and physics
 Bra–ket notation, a notation for describing quantum states in the theory of quantum mechanics
 Frölicher–Nijenhuis bracket, an extension of the Lie bracket of vector fields
 Moyal bracket, in physics
 Nijenhuis–Richardson bracket or algebraic bracket
 Schouten–Nijenhuis bracket, in differential geometry

Other uses
 Brackets (text editor), an open-source HTML editor
 Bracket, in typeface anatomy, the curve connecting a serif to the main stroke
 Bracket (tournament), a diagrammatic representation of the series of games played during a tournament
 Bracket turn, a figure skating move

See also
 Tax bracket (or income bracket)
 Bracket clock
 Bracketing (disambiguation)
 Bracketing, the photographic technique of taking multiple shots of the same subject with different camera-settings
 Bracketing (phenomenology), suspension of judgment as to the answer of a question, and proceed as if there were some answer
  
 
 Parenthesis (disambiguation)